The Prince Philip Designers Prize is an annual design recognition given by the Chartered Society of Designers and originally awarded by Prince Philip, Duke of Edinburgh (1921–2021).

It is the longest running design award in the United Kingdom, having been started in 1959 as the Duke of Edinburgh's Prize for Elegant Design.  The recognition is on the basis of a design career which has upheld the highest standards and broken new ground.

It was agreed in December 2015, that the Chartered Society of Designers should re-introduce and manage it as a global prize after the Design Council had ceased in 2011 after managing it for 52 years.

Winners

References

External links
 Official website
 50 years of innovation in design, prize winners 1959–2009

1959 establishments in the United Kingdom
British science and technology awards
Design awards
Design Council